Christopher Pierre Hope (born September 29, 1980) is a former American football safety in the National Football League (NFL). He played college football for Florida State University.  He was drafted by the Pittsburgh Steelers in the third round of the 2002 NFL Draft, and has also played for the Tennessee Titans and Atlanta Falcons. He helped the Steelers win Super Bowl XL against the Seattle Seahawks.

High school career
Hope was a USA Today All-USA first-team and Parade All-American selection as a senior at Rock Hill High School. During his high school career, Hope recorded 114 tackles and three interceptions as a defensive back while rushing for 1319 yards and 20 touchdowns as a running back. He totaled 464 tackles, 10 interceptions and four fumble recoveries during his four-year varsity career and established a school record as he started 55-straight games during his star-studded prep career.

Ranked as No. 1 defensive back prospect in the nation by Prep Star and rated No. 3 defensive back and No. 50 overall prospect in America by National Recruiting Advisor, he was a member of Atlanta Journal-Constitution Super Southern 1000.  Selected to Orlando Sentinel All-Southern team.  Rated as No. 1 defensive back recruit nationally by Tampa Tribune and ranked as sixth-best recruit nationally by St. Petersburg Times. Recorded 114 tackles and three interceptions as defensive back while rushing for 1,319 yards and 20 touchdowns as running back.

College career
While attending Florida State University, Hope played for the Florida State Seminoles football team.  In 1998, freshman year, he played in every game at free safety, recording 34 tackles, with a pair of pass deflections, a fumble recovery, and a forced fumble. In 1999, Sophomore year, he played in every game, starting the final six contests at free safety recording 41 tackles, with two stops for losses of 4 yards, and a forced fumble. He also tied for the team lead with four interceptions for 17 yards in returns.

In 2000, Junior year, Chris Hope started all year at free safety. He was fourth on the team with 83 tackles, including five stops for losses of 10 yards, intercepted two passes and deflected eight others, recovered and caused a fumble. In 2001, Senior year, Chris Hope started every game at free safety. He recorded 76 tackles with nine pass deflections and three interceptions.

Professional career

Pittsburgh Steelers

Chris Hope was drafted in the third round number 94th overall by the Pittsburgh Steelers for the 2002 season. He started out the 2002 season on special teams and became a strong special teams player. In an October 27 game against the Baltimore Ravens he caused a fumble on a second quarter kickoff that led to a touchdown. He got to play his first extensive game on November 24, 2002, against Cincinnati due to injuries in the Steelers secondary picking up three tackles and one special teams tackle. The 2003 season was not much different from his first. Chris Hope played mainly special teams.

In an October 26, 2003, game against St. Louis he delivered a crushing block to free Antwaan Randle El to return a punt 84 yards. In 2004, Hope became the starting free safety for the Pittsburgh Steelers. Chris Hope would pick up 58 tackles forcing one fumble, four pass deflections, and intercept one pass with a return of 41 yards. In 2005 Chris Hope would once again start as Free Safety for the Pittsburgh Steelers. He had 69 tackles forcing one fumble, and he picked off 3 passes with a total of 60 return yards. Chris Hope was one of the many who helped the Pittsburgh Steelers reach and win Super Bowl XL.

Tennessee Titans
Shortly thereafter, Hope signed a six-year contract with the Tennessee Titans. In his first year, he led the team with five interceptions and 128 tackles. In a 2007 game against Cincinnati, Hope suffered a spinal cord injury that ended his season and required surgery in the offseason.

Atlanta Falcons
On June 29, 2012, Hope signed with the Atlanta Falcons. Hope made his mark with special teams leading with team tackles.

Detroit Lions
Chris Hope was signed by the Detroit Lions on June 24, 2013. With the signing Chris Hope was reunited with head coach Jim Schwartz. Hope was coached by Schwartz in Tennessee, where he earned a pro bowl spot in 2008.

On August 25, 2013, Hope was released by the Detroit Lions.

NFL career statistics

Personal life
 Founded the iCHOPE Charitable Fund to support volunteerism and charitable efforts in his hometown of Rock Hill, SC 
 His cousin, Gerald Dixon, played linebacker for nine seasons (1993–2001) in the NFL with the Cleveland Browns, Cincinnati Bengals and San Diego Chargers
 Favorite Bible Scripture Romans 5:3-4 - And not only so, but we glory in tribulations also: knowing that tribulation worketh patience; perseverance, character; and character, hope.
 Hope is married to Linda De La Cruz Hope, proprietor of The L in Luxury Real Estate.

References

External links
 Atlanta Falcons bio
 

1980 births
Living people
American Conference Pro Bowl players
American football safeties
Atlanta Falcons players
Detroit Lions players
Florida State Seminoles football players
People from Rock Hill, South Carolina
Pittsburgh Steelers players
Players of American football from South Carolina
Tennessee Titans players
Rock Hill High School (South Carolina) alumni
Ed Block Courage Award recipients